Ateker, or ŋaTekerin, is a common name for the closely related Lango people, Jie, Karamojong, Turkana, Toposa, Nyangatom and Teso peoples and their languages. These ethnic groups inhabit an area across Uganda and Kenya. Itung'a (a vernacular term meaning "people of one language") and Teso have been used among ethnographers, while the term Teso-Turkana is sometimes used for the languages, which are of Eastern Nilotic stock. Ateker means 'clan' or 'tribe' in the Teso language. In the Lango language, the word for clan is atekere.

In the Turkana language, Ateker means a distinct group with related customs, laws and lifestyle and who share a common ancestry. Members of one Ateker have a common character of mutual respect in their diversity. Each member group of Ateker occupies its own territory and exercises authority over its own land and people independent of each other.

The word Ateker is a generic term for "related peoples" or "relatives" (the term also refers to clan). It is derived from the root ker, which has two root meanings: fear and respect. Ateker, in its true sense, is a union of free people with mutual recognition and respect for each other. In the context of ethnic identity and nationhood, the Turkana language classifies different people with common characteristics as belonging to distinct ateker. The Maa people belong to Ateker a Ngi Maasa Maasai and so on. The Turkana and the Karamojong and Lango people belong to one Ateker.

History

Origins
The ancestral cradleland of the Ateker communities is thought to lie in Longiro, 'the place of engiro' in the Sudan.

Early 18th century
According to Turkana traditions recorded by Emley (1927); the Turkana were originally members of a tribe called 'Dung'iru' (i.e Longiro), which was said to live between Turkana and the Nile river. The traditions state that the Turkana came east, as a sub-section of the Ngie (i.e Jie) tribe, where there stayed for some time. This country was "occupied by that tribe to this day".

Tradition indicates that the Karamojong ancestral territory was north Eastern part of Uganda. From here, movements in a southern direction then east and finally northwards brought them to present Matheniko, located south of what was then Maliri territory. These movements appear to have displaced some Oropom whose territory then stretched into these areas, however traditions suggest that the Oropom were at this time numerically superior and peaceful relations generally prevailed.

While at Matheniko, the people now known as Dodoth separated from the rest of the Karamojong. They moved north to the vicinity of Loyoro which was on the fringe of Maliri held territory and here established themselves. Tradition relates that the encounter was peaceful and this appears to be borne out by relations between these communities in later times when they had by then moved away from each other.

Turkana

According to traditions recorded by Wilson (1970), the Jie advanced eastward and entered the present Karimoja territory at Adilang, an area that was at this time occupied by the Maliri. The nature of contact seems to have been hostile for the Maliri retreated eastwards toward the region of Koten Mountain where they stayed for a while. This state of affairs did not hold for long, for the people from the hill of Turkan, now calling themselves Turkana, broke away from the Jie at Kotido and started advancing eastward. This brought extreme pressure to bear on the Maliri at Koten, causing this group to break in two.

One group of Maliri, still known as such to the Karamojong but as Merille elsewhere, moved further eastward settling on the east of the Turkana escarpment. The other group, calling themselves Pokotozek moved south and arrived at Nakiloro, which lies on the Turkana escarpment just north of the Moroto mountain.

Fragmentation
According to Turkana traditions noted by Lamphear (1988) concerning the early Turkana community, the developing community "formed itself into two 'major parts', the Curo and the Monia". He also recorded traditions regarding an assimilation.

Lamphear records population groupings that emerged from this assimilation and of population dispersal. He notes that the two major groups took on a common name 'Turkana' while some settlers abandoned the Tarash to move south to the area beyond Mount Elgon. He also notes that about the same time some far-ranging contingents of Bantu-speaking Meru were absorbed by several Turkana clans.

Interactions

In pushing eastward the Turkana had arrived at a dramatic ecological and cultural frontier. All the way to the shores of Lake Turkana lay arid land peppered with the occasional cultivatable oasis. This hard country was inhabited by communities that were radically different from any the Turkana had encountered before. There were three communities already resident, who lived in close association with each other, herding an array of livestock which included exotic creatures with long necks and humps on their backs - the first camels the Ateker had encountered.

Of the three societies, one appears to have made the most impact on the Turkana, they kept sheep, goats and camels like their associates but specialized in cattle. They had lighter-colored skin compared to the Turkana and they liberally smeared themselves with ochre - the Turkana called them the 'red people' and named them Kor. The Kor's  kin were known to the Turkana as Rantalle and Poran. Together these allies controlled all the land stretching out before the Turkana to the east.

There were three Turkana 'adakari' (i.e ateker) during the early 20th century. Turkana tradition states that the expansion to Turkwel had been carried out by two of these ateker, the 'Nithir' and the 'Ngamatak'. At Turkwel, the Nithir split in two, one section retaining the original name while the other was known as 'Nibelai'. As of 1888, Ngamtak was the name of the south-western frontier of Turkana territory.

The Nithir name was said to derive from 'ithiger' (i.e  Siger), an 'ornament' and the Nithir were said to be so called for their love of decoration.

Later 18th century
Turkana folklore records that as their early settlements expanded north, they reached a hill which came to be known as Moru Ang'issiger where they met another group of 'red people' who herded a distinctive type of long-horned black cattle. It was said that this community once held most of the surrounding country until the Kor and their allies came up from the south and took it from them. Most of the women of this community had an adornment of a single cowrie shell attached to a forelock. This dangling cowrie shell was referred to as esigirait, pl. ngisigira (Karamoja). The Turkana called them Siger and their home Moru Ang'issiger, (later Mt. Siger/Mt. Sekker).

As the end of the 18th century approached, demographic pressure started being felt by the Turkana. All the available grazing lands to west - the direction the Turkana had come from, was occupied by other Ateker societies of the Karamojong and to the east lay the lands of the formidable confederacy of the Kor, Rantalle and Poran. The Turkana thus turned their gaze north to the territory of the weakened Siger, and, coveting their highland pastures, began to encroach on the them, just as the Rift Valley was seized by a terrible drought.

Common characteristics

Language 
Member of one Ateker speak one language or distinct languages which developed from one common language.

Laws and customs 
Each Ateker has distinct laws and customs. The laws and customs of people of one Ateker are similar.

Lifestyle 
Members of each Ateker live their lives in a similar lifestyle. Diversified groups within one Ateker usually have traces of laws and customs that can be traced to the original group.

Land 
Land is one characteristic that helps in determining membership in an Ateker. Members of one Ateker usually occupy adjoining areas. Land adjudication forms the basis for laws and customs. In the Turkana Ateker, land is subdivided into regions or territorial sections, ŋiTela. Each Ekitela institutes its own common laws which are derived from the general laws of the whole nation or kingdom.

Religion 
Religious beliefs of one Ateker are similar. The supreme deity worshiped has one common name.

Common ancestry 
Members of one Ateker have a common ancestral origin.
Members of Ateker have different ancestral origin. within the Ateker sub divisions of the Turkana/Ngiturukana and the Karimojong/Ngikarimojong, the Karimojong/ngikarimojong subscribe to Nakadanya which is believed to be the holly ground for Ngimatheniko/Ngikori (Moroto District), Ngipian/Ngimuriai (nabilatuk and Nakapiripirit Districts), Ngibokora (Napak District) and the Dodoth/ngikaleeso of Kaabong and Karenga Districts. the Turkana/Ngiturkana of Nrthwestern Kenya are subscribed to Moru-anayiece as their holly and Ancestral ground. However, they speak related languages and can hear eah other.

Ateker laws

Among members of the Turkana-Karimojong Ateker, it is prohibited to kill members of the same Ateker. Killing members of the same Ateker is like killing one's own brother. Other laws govern marriage (akuuta). On marriage, one is not allowed to marry front the same Ateker. Marriage also unites the "Ngatekerin( plural of Ateker). Divorce (elakit or akilak) is also handled by the Ateker and before divorce is accepted, the different parties from both Ngatekerin try to resolve the problem. Other laws govern grazing (achok or akitwar) lands, which elders precise over  ceremonies (Akiriket) like rain making, peace, annual livestock blessings (Akero) etc.

References 

Ethnic groups in Uganda
Ethnic groups in Kenya